"Relationship Goals" is a song co-written, co-produced, and recorded by Canadian country artist Steven Lee Olsen. The song was written with Brandon Day and Ava Suppelsa. It was the lead single off his extended play Relationship Goals, the first release from a joint venture between The Core Entertainment and Universal Music Canada.

Critical reception
Angela Stefano of The Boot stated that "Relationship Goals" "lays out the singer and songwriter's hopes in love", noting heavy use of the guitar and "traces" of steel guitar. Country100 named the track their "Fresh Music Friday Song of the Day" for August 13, 2021. CTV's etalk noted a video of Olsen singing the song to his dog, describing the song as being "about puppy love". Katie Colley of ET Canada referred to the track as a "catchy new single".

Accolades

Music video
The official music video for "Relationship Goals" was directed by Taylor Kelly and premiered on August 25, 2021. It was filmed and shot in Nashville, Tennessee, at a backyard pool party. The video features eleven different Easter eggs.

Track listings
Digital download - EP

Digital download - single
 "Relationship Goals" – 2:47(Acoustic Version)

Charts

Awards and nominations

References

2021 songs
2021 singles
Steven Lee Olsen songs
Songs written by Steven Lee Olsen
Universal Music Canada singles